The Koti is a Panama-registered oil tanker that in December 2017 was seized by South Korea for suspected violations of United Nations sanctions against North Korea.

See also
 Lighthouse Winmore

References

Oil tankers
History of North Korea
Ships of Panama